Washington County Transit (WCT), formerly County Commuter, is the primary provider of mass transportation in Washington County, Maryland. The agency operates 14 routes from Monday through Saturday. Total ridership averages 516,000 passenger trips annually.

Route list
WCT operates the following routes:
111-Valley Mall
112-Valley Mall Express
113-Valley Mall Night Run
114-Long Meadow Night Run
116-Long Meadow via Locust
117-Long Meadow via Eastern
221-Robinwood
222-Smithsburg (Monday-Friday)
223-Smithsburg (Saturday)
331-Funkstown
333-West End
441-Williamsport
443-Maugansville
552-Premium Outlets

References

External links
 Washington County Transit

Bus transportation in Maryland